Matthew Tyler Costello (born August 5, 1993) is an American-born naturalised Ivorian professional basketball player for Baskonia of the Spanish Liga ACB and the EuroLeague. He played college basketball for Michigan State.

High school career
Costello was a highly touted recruit coming out of Bay City Western High School.
 2012 Hal Schram Mr. Basketball Award winner 
 2012 Gatorade Michigan High School Player of the Year
 2012 Parade Magazine All-American
 2x Detroit Free Press and The Detroit News Dream Team  
 2011 Gatorade Michigan High School Player of the Year 
Costello averaged 25.1 points, 19.1 rebounds, 4.0 assists and 4.0 blocks per game at Bay City Western for Coach Chris Watz. Costello led the Warriors to the Class 4A regional semifinals, an 18–6 record, and a second-straight district championship. He finished his career as the school's all-time leader in points (1,518), rebounds (1,069) and blocked shots (280). He was one of the best recruits in the country. He ranked among the top-100 players in the nation by the following:
 Rivals.com (#83)(#21 power forward)
 ESPNU100 (#87) (#17 power forward)
 Scout.com (#95) (#23 center)
As a junior, he averaged 19.8 points, 13.0 rebounds and 3.8 blocks as a junior, shooting 53.4 percent from the field and 72 percent from the foul line. Costello posted a school-record 19 double-doubles. He helped his team improve from 10–11 in 2010 to 24–3 in 2011, leading Bay City Western to Class A state semifinals for the first time in school history. His stats earned him MVP of Saginaw Valley Association. Costello averaged 16.7 points 11.8 rebounds, 3 blocks and 3 assists as a sophomore and set a school record with 14 blocks in a single game. In 2010 Bay City Times named him to the Dream Team and first-team All-Saginaw Valley League selection. He was a National Honor Society member.

College career

Freshman year
As a freshman, Costello appeared in 30 games, averaging 6.1 minutes,1.5 points and 1.3 rebounds, shooting .469 from the field. His .824 free-throw percentage (14–17) was tops on the team. He ranked fourth on the team with 13 blocks, averaging a block every 14.2 minutes. Playing time increased when he averaged 8.0 minutes in the last 13 games after playing more than eight minutes just once in the first 23 games. Costello turned in one of his best games in a 75–52 win over No. 4 Michigan (2/12), scoring a season-high eight points and grabbing a Big Ten season-high six rebounds, hitting all three field goal attempts and both free throw attempts. He scored six points and grabbed a season-high seven rebounds against Tuskegee (12/15), blocked a season-high three shots against No. 1 Indiana (2/19), and blocked two shots each against Texas Southern (11/18), Nebraska (2/16) and Valparaiso (3/21) in the second round of the NCAA Tournament. Costello missed the first two games of the season and both exhibition games with a bruised back.

Sophomore year
Costello appeared in 34 games, starting 20, averaging 4.0 points and 3.3 rebounds in 14.7 minutes per contest, He led the team with 43 blocks, ranking 10th in the Big Ten (1.3 bpg). His 43 blocks were the seventh-best single-season total in school history, and the most ever by a Spartan sophomore. He blocked 24 shots in Big Ten contests (1.3 bpg), ranking eighth in the conference. Costello ranked second on the team in field-goal percentage (.598) In December he missed 4 games due to mononucleosis. He posted his first career double-double in an overtime win at Iowa (1/28), scoring a season-high 11 points and grabbing a career-high 12 rebounds; nine of his 11 points came in the last five minutes of regulation and overtime. Costello scored 10 points against Penn State (2/6), adding six rebounds and a season-high tying three assists as well as dishing out three assists against Columbia (11/15) Costello scored six or more points in 10 contests and grabbed five or more rebounds in eight games • Tallied nine points and eight rebounds against Michigan (1/25) • Also scored nine points against Northwestern (2/13) • Tallied seven points and eight rebounds against Minnesota (1/11) He made improvements on playing time and started 13 of 18 Big Ten contests, averaging 4.9 points and 3.6 rebounds in conference games Costello made history when he blocked a career-best six shots at Illinois (1/18), tying the second-best single-game effort in MSU history. He blocked two or more shots in 10 contests. At the end of the year, he received Academic All-Big Ten honors.

Junior year

Costello appeared in 39 games, starting six, averaging 7.0 points and 5.0 rebounds in 20.4 minutes. He shot .579 from the floor, ranking second among teammates with more than 100 field-goal attempts. Costello ranked 13th in the Big Ten in blocked shots overall (1.2 bpg) and seventh in Big Ten games (1.5 bpg). His 48 blocks rank as the seventh-best single-season total in MSU history. Costello managed to score in double figures in 11 games and grabbed double-figure rebounds in two contests. He posted two double-doubles vs. Loyola (11/21; 13 points, 11 rebounds) and Texas Southern (12/20; 17 pts., 10 reb.). Costello was a team leader in many categories and led MSU in scoring in two games and in rebounding in eight contests. He scored a career-best 17 points against Texas Southern (12/20) and scored 15 points against Arkansas-Pine Bluff (12/6). His season-high of 11 rebounds came against Loyola (11/21). He blocked two or more shots in 13 games, including a season-high four against Michigan (2/1) and Purdue (3/4). Costello grabbed seven or more rebounds in 14 contests, including five games with nine or more boards. He started the first six games of the season, then came off the bench for the final 33 contests. At the end of the year, he received Academic All-Big Ten honors. With Costello commanding the post, the Spartans were able to reach the 2015 Final Four.

Senior year
During Costello's senior year, he made many improvements to his game. Because of this, he received many end of the year awards. He currently has the third-most blocks all-time in Michigan State basketball history. Costello was honored with a selection to the Reese's College All-Star game in Houston, Texas.

 CBS-BigTen 2nd Team
 BigTen 2nd Team Media
 BigTen 3rd Team Coaches
 Bleacher Report Team of the Week; Week 11
 Sports Illustrated- All Glue Team (Captain)
 Reese's College All Star Game
 Portsmouth Invitational Tournament
 PIT All-Tournament Team

Professional career

Iowa Energy (2016–2017)
After going undrafted in the 2016 NBA draft, Costello joined the Atlanta Hawks for the 2016 NBA Summer League. On July 26, 2016, he signed with the Hawks, but was later waived on October 17 after appearing in two preseason games. He signed with the Memphis Grizzlies on October 20, but was waived again on October 24. Five days later, he was acquired by the Iowa Energy of the NBA Development League as an affiliate player of the Grizzlies.

San Antonio Spurs (2017–2018)
On July 24, 2017, Costello signed a two-way contract with the San Antonio Spurs. Under a two-way contract, he divided time between the Spurs and San Antonio's G-League affiliate, the Austin Spurs. He made his NBA debut on November 12 during a blowout 133–94 win over the Chicago Bulls.

Scandone Avellino (2018–2019)
On August 2, 2018, Costello signed a deal with the Italian club Sidigas Avellino of the LBA.

Gran Canaria (2019–2021)
Costello averaged 11.4 points and 7.8 rebounds per game for Gran Canaria during the 2019–20 season. He inked a two-year contract extension on June 25, 2020. During the 2020–21 season, Costello averaged 12.5 points, 5.9 rebounds and 1.2 assists in the Liga ACB, as well as 10.2 points, 6.5 rebounds and 1.7 assists in the EuroCup.

Baskonia (2021–present)
On July 5, 2021, Costello officially signed a three-year contract with fellow Liga ACB club Baskonia, marking his EuroLeague debut.

National team career
Costello was granted the Ivorian citizenship and played with the Ivory Coast national basketball team during AfroBasket 2021.

Personal life
Costello is the son of Mike and Jen Costello. He majored in interdisciplinary studies in social science with a concentration in human capital and society.

NBA career statistics

Regular season

|-
| style="text-align:left;"| 
| style="text-align:left;"| San Antonio
| 4 || 0 || 8.0 || .500 || .000 || .000 || 2.3 || .5 || .5 || .5 || 1.0
|- class="sortbottom"
| style="text-align:center;" colspan="2"| Career
| 4 || 0 || 8.0 || .500 || .000 || .000 || 2.3 || .5 || .5 || .5 || 1.0

References

External links

Michigan State bio

1993 births
Living people
American expatriate basketball people in Italy
American expatriate basketball people in Spain
American men's basketball players
Austin Spurs players
Basketball players from Michigan
CB Gran Canaria players
Centers (basketball)
Iowa Energy players
Ivorian expatriate basketball people in Spain
Ivorian men's basketball players
Lega Basket Serie A players
Liga ACB players
Michigan State Spartans men's basketball players
Parade High School All-Americans (boys' basketball)
People from Bay County, Michigan
Power forwards (basketball)
San Antonio Spurs players
Saski Baskonia players
S.S. Felice Scandone players
Undrafted National Basketball Association players